Ariaspidae is a family  of extinct cyathaspidiform heterostracan agnathans in the suborder Cyathaspidida.

Family Ariaspidae contains Ariaspis, and its sister-taxa originally contained within Anglaspididae/Anglaspidinae, including Anglaspis, Listraspis, Liliaspis, and Paraliliaspis.

References 

 Phylogenetic patterns in the heterostracan families Cyathaspidae, Ariaspidae and Ctenaspidae. Lundgren Mette and Blom Henning, The 2nd Wiman meeting : Carl Wiman's Legacy: 100 years of Swedish Palaeontology : Uppsala 17–18 November 2011, 16-17 p.

Cyathaspidida
Prehistoric jawless fish families